René Gómez (born 9 February 1944) is a Cuban weightlifter. He competed in the men's middleweight event at the 1968 Summer Olympics.

References

1944 births
Living people
Cuban male weightlifters
Olympic weightlifters of Cuba
Weightlifters at the 1968 Summer Olympics
Sportspeople from Matanzas
20th-century Cuban people